Lieutenant-General Mushtaq Ahmad Baig HI(M) (1951 – 25 February 2008) was the surgeon general of the Pakistani Army until his death from a suicide-bomb attack on 25 Feb. 2008. He was an ophthalmologist by profession. Baig is the oldest senior Army officer to be targeted and killed since Pakistan's involvement in the War on Terror and the North West-Pakistan Conflict.

Early life
Baig was born in Lehr Sultanpur Village, Chakwal District, in 1951 to a middle-class family. He graduated from King Edward Medical University (KEMU) with a Bachelor of Medicine and Bachelor of Surgery (BMBS) in 1974. Two years later, Baig was granted a military commission, and was subsequently inducted into the Army Medical Corps. Baig completed his Master of Surgery (M.S.) degree and received a Doctorate of Ophthalmology from the Army Medical College (AMC).

After joining the Pakistan Army, Baig quickly climbed in rank as he excelled at various assignments. In 2003 he was promoted to major general, and made commandant of Army Medical College Rawalpindi (AMCR). Baig is credited for implementing revolutionary changes in the medical services in the Pakistani Armed Forces (PAF), as well as improvements for both Air Force and Navy medical services. In 2006, Baig was awarded the second-highest military award, the Hilal-i-Imtiaz–Military. That same year, he was promoted to Lieutenant General. In 2007, he was made the surgeon general of the Pakistani Army and was promoted to colonel commandant of the Army Medical Corps.

Assassination
On 25 February 2008, General Baig's vehicle was targeted by a suicide bomber. The suicide bomber, suspected to be linked to Al-Qaeda or the Taliban, struck when Baig's car was stopped at a traffic light on a busy road in Rawalpindi. The attack killed General Baig, the suicide bomber, and eight civilians, leaving twelve wounded.

The assassination occurred a week after Pakistan had held peaceful parliamentary elections. Following the attack, an emergency was declared in the city of Rawalpindi, with civilian and military hospitals being put on high alert. Pakistani authorities stated that General Baig was the highest-ranking army officer to be killed in line of duty since Pakistan became a member of the anti-terror coalition in 2001.

Aftermath
President Parvez Musharraf and care-taker Prime Minister Muhammad Mian Soomro strongly condemned the attack. Musharraf and Soomro said such heinous acts of violence cannot deter the government from its resolve in its fight against terrorism. President Musharraf spoke highly of Baig and described him as an exceptional officer of high caliber who showed a remarkable commitment to serving humanity.

References

External links
Pakistan army's top medic killed
Wikinews on Lieutenant-General Mushtaq Ahmad Baig

1958 births
2008 deaths
Assassinated military personnel
King Edward Medical University alumni
Military personnel killed in the insurgency in Khyber Pakhtunkhwa
B
Pakistani military doctors
Pakistani ophthalmologists
People from Chakwal District
People murdered in Punjab, Pakistan
Recipients of Hilal-i-Imtiaz
Terrorism deaths in Pakistan